Mark Burchett (April 20, 1960 – July 12, 2014) was a Hollywood film director, screenwriter and film producer of horror movies.

Early life

Burchett was born in Cincinnati, Ohio.  He was educated at Lakota High School in West Chester, Ohio and the University of Cincinnati's College Conservatory of Music with a BFA in Broadcasting and Film.

During high school he was active at the school's radio station, WLHS, as well as the drama department, where he wrote and directed a student-run play in his senior year.

While in college, he worked as a producer of public service shows at radio stations WKRC-AM and WKRQ-FM (Q102).

Career
In 1994, along with his wife, Denise Burchett, and Michael D. Fox, he formed production company B+ Productions.  He directed the film Satanic Yuppies that was created with Michael D. Fox, and wrote or produced other horror films including Vamps, Vamps 2 and Hammerhead.  He also worked as an Art Director on the independent features, Faded and Drip. He is currently completing a film titled, Hell-o-ween.

He collaborated frequently with actress Amber Newman and actors Paul Morris and Rob Calvert.
His crew often included Jeff Barklage (camera/lighting) and Eric J. Chatterjee (art/production)

The film Vamps was called "The Gone With the Wind of stripper-vampire movies" by rock legend Alice Cooper, and Vamps 2 received 3 & 1/2 stars by b-movie guru Joe Bob Briggs.

Burchett was also a founding member of the Southern Ohio Filmmakers Association and has served twice as its president.  .

Death
On July 12, 2014, Burchett died at the age of 54 from unknown causes.

References

External links

1960 births
2014 deaths
American film directors
American male screenwriters
Writers from Cincinnati
Screenwriters from Ohio
Film producers from Ohio